Vladyslav Serhiyovych Bukhov (born 5 July 2002) is a Ukrainian swimmer. He competed in the men's 50 metre freestyle at the 2020 Summer Olympics.

References

External links
 

2002 births
Living people
Ukrainian male swimmers
Ukrainian male freestyle swimmers
Olympic swimmers of Ukraine
Swimmers at the 2020 Summer Olympics
Sportspeople from Donetsk
21st-century Ukrainian people